Poor Mountain Natural Area Preserve is a  Natural Area Preserve located on Poor Mountain in Roanoke County, Virginia.  The preserve protects the world's largest population of piratebush (Buckleya distichophylla), a globally rare parasitic shrub.  The mountain derives its name from the fact that the soils on its slopes are poor, due to their base of metamorphosed sandstone bedrock. The preserve's pine-oak/heath woodlands include Table Mountain pine, eastern hemlock, several species of oak, and shrubs including huckleberry, mountain laurel, and fetterbush.

Poor Mountain Natural Area Preserve is owned and maintained by the Virginia Department of Conservation and Recreation.

See also
 List of Virginia Natural Area Preserves

References

External links
Virginia Department of Conservation and Recreation: Poor Mountain Natural Area Preserve

Virginia Natural Area Preserves
Protected areas of Roanoke County, Virginia